The 2011 Vaahteraliiga season was the 32nd season of the highest level of American football in Finland. The regular season took place between May 20 and August 7, 2011. The Finnish champion was determined in the playoffs and at the championship game Vaahteramalja XXXII the Helsinki Wolverines won the Seinäjoki Crocodiles.

Standings

Playoffs

References

American football in Finland
Vaahteraliiga
Vaahteraliiga